The Eastern Line is the name of the suburban rail service in Auckland, New Zealand between Britomart and Manukau via the North Island Main Trunk (NIMT) and Manukau Branch. Services are operated by Auckland One Rail under the Auckland Transport brand.

In December 2014, all Eastern Line train services began terminating at Manukau, rather than alternating between Manukau and Papakura. Electrification of the Auckland suburban network was completed in July 2015, and all passenger services on this line are electrified.

Construction 
The line from Auckland to Westfield via Glen Innes was constructed as the Westfield Deviation of the North Island Main Trunk. This eastern deviation had been proposed as early as the 1870s, but various events meant that it was never constructed, until traffic on the Auckland – Newmarket section of the NIMT began to experience significant delays.

A small reclamation was made between 1905 and 1916,  out of Queen Street into Mechanics Bay for goods yards and maintenance sheds. The remaining 14.28 km (8 miles & 70 chain) section was built as the "Westfield Deviation" between 1924 and 1930 by the Public Works Department as part of general improvements to Auckland's rail network, and authorised (estimated cost £375,000) by the Railways Improvement Authorisation Act, 1914.

The Purewa Tunnel, a major engineering work halfway between the city and Glen Innes, was built in the mid-1920s by experienced miners who had worked on the construction of the North Auckland Line.

The section from Mechanics Bay to Ōrākei required significant reclamation over Hobson Bay. At the same time a new road, Tamaki Drive, was built alongside part of the railway line. A notable feature of the deviation is that no road-rail level crossings were created by its construction.

The Westfield Deviation via the Purewa Tunnel opened for goods traffic on 1 September 1929 using the down line to Westfield for single-line working, but was not used for passenger traffic until after the up line to Auckland was opened on 11 May 1930. The construction and opening of this line coincided with the then new Auckland Railway Station.   The first passenger train over the line was a Wellington Limited express, when a derailment at Penrose caused it to be diverted on 18 September 1930. The new station and deviation were officially opened on 24 November 1930.

See also 
 Public transport in Auckland
 List of Auckland railway stations

References

External links 

 

Railway lines in New Zealand
Public transport in Auckland
Rail transport in Auckland